W. N. Herbert , also known as Bill Herbert (born 1961) is a poet from Dundee, Scotland. He writes in both English and Scots. He and Richard Price founded the poetry magazine Gairfish. He currently teaches at Newcastle University.

Early life
Herbert was born in 1961 in Dundee. He was educated at Grove Academy and then studied at Brasenose College, Oxford gaining a Doctor of Philosophy in 1992 after completing a thesis on the work of Hugh MacDiarmid.

Career
In 1994, he was one of 20 poets chosen by a panel of judges, as the New Generation in a promotion organised by the Poetry Society. He was one of the writers involved in the Informationist poetry movement that emerged in Scotland in the 1990s.

He became a Professor of Poetry & Creative Writing at the School of English Literature, Language and Linguistics, Newcastle University.

In September 2013, Herbert was appointed as Dundee's first makar.

Awards and honours
He became a Fellow of the Royal Society of Literature in 2015.

Books

Poetry collections
 Dundee Doldrums (1991)
 The Testament of the Reverend Thomas Dick (1994)
 Cabaret McGonagall (1996) 
 The Laurelude (1998)
 The Big Bumper Book of Troy (2002)
 Bad Shaman Blues (2006) 
 Three Men on the Metro, with Andy Croft and Paul Summers, Five Leaves (2009)
 Omnesia (2013) 
 The Wreck of the Fathership (2020)

Literary criticism
 To Circumjack MacDiarmid (1992)

References

External links
 Biography at the British Council 
 Herbert's page at Newcastle University
 Professor Herbert's homepage
 Profile at Bloodaxe Books
 Profile at Scottish Poetry Library

1961 births
Fellows of the Royal Society of Literature
Poets from Dundee
Living people
People educated at Grove Academy
Alumni of Brasenose College, Oxford